Lieutenant Colonel Neville Bowes Elliott-Cooper,  (22 January 1889 – 11 February 1918) was a British Army officer and an English recipient of the Victoria Cross, the highest award for gallantry in the face of the enemy that can be awarded to British and Commonwealth forces.

Early life
Elliott-Cooper was born on 22 January 1889 in London, the youngest son of Sir Robert Elliott-Cooper. He was educated at Eton and the Royal Military College, Sandhurst.

When he was 28 years old, and a temporary lieutenant colonel commanding the 8th Battalion the Royal Fusiliers, British Army, he was awarded the Victoria Cross for his actions on 30 November 1917 east of La Vacquerie, near Cambrai, France, during the Battle of Cambrai.

Citation

He died of his wounds while a prisoner of war on 11 February 1918 in Hannover, Germany.

His Victoria Cross is displayed at the Royal Fusiliers Museum, Tower of London, England.

References

British World War I recipients of the Victoria Cross
Companions of the Distinguished Service Order
Recipients of the Military Cross
Royal Fusiliers officers
British Army personnel of World War I
British military personnel killed in World War I
1889 births
1918 deaths
People educated at Eton College
Military personnel from London
Graduates of the Royal Military College, Sandhurst
People from the City of Westminster
World War I prisoners of war held by Germany
British Army recipients of the Victoria Cross
British World War I prisoners of war
Burials at the Ohlsdorf Cemetery